"Ramona" is a song by Australian-New Zealand band Dragon released in October 1982. The song was Dragon's first and only single to be released on the EMI Music label. The song peaked at number 79 on the Australian Kent Music Report. 

It is included on the band's 1998 album, Snake Eyes on the Paradise Greatest Hits 1976–1989

Track listing 
 7" (EMI-875)
 "Ramona" (Paul Hewson) - 3:40 
 "Blacktown Boogie" (Robert Taylor, Marc Hunter, Todd Hunter) - 3:15

Charts

References 

1982 songs
1982 singles
Dragon (band) songs
EMI Records singles